The Second Söder cabinet is the current state government of Bavaria, sworn in on 12 November 2018 after Markus Söder was elected as Minister-President of Bavaria by the members of the Landtag of Bavaria. It is the 27th Cabinet of Bavaria.

It was formed after the 2018 Bavarian state election by the Christian Social Union (CSU) and Free Voters (FW). Excluding the Minister-President, the cabinet comprised fourteen ministers and three state secretaries. Eleven ministers and two state secretaries are members of the CSU and three ministers and one state secretary are members of the Free Voters.

Formation 

The previous cabinet was a majority government of the CSU led by Minister-President Markus Söder, who took office in March 2018.

The election took place on 14 October 2018; it resulted in the CSU losing its absolute majority and recording its worst result since 1950. The Greens improved from fourth to second place with 18% of the vote while the SPD lost more than half its vote share and dropped from second to fifth. The Free Voters remained the third-largest party with 12% of the vote, an improvement of two and a half percentage points. The AfD debuted at 10%; the FDP re-entered the Landtag with 5%.

The CSU met with each party except the AfD, initially expressing interest in both The Greens and Free Voters. On 18 October, they announced they would seek a coalition with the Free Voters. Söder stated that The Greens differed too much from the CSU on refugee and domestic security policy, while the FW held agreeable positions on important issues.

Coalition negotiations between the CSU and FW were finalised on 2 November, and both parties approved the agreement on 4 November.

Söder was elected as Minister-President by the Landtag on 8 November, winning 110 votes out of 202 cast. The new cabinet took office on 12 November.

Composition

External links

References 

Cabinets of Bavaria
State governments of Germany
Cabinets established in 2018
2018 establishments in Germany
Current governments